A golf mirror is a specialized periscope used by spectators at golf tournaments where the crowds grow large enough to inhibit ones view of play.  The golf mirror allows the user to view over the heads of those in the crowd so they can see the golfing action.

Optical devices
Golf equipment